The three-toed worm lizard (Bipes tridactylus) is a worm lizard species in the family Amphisbaenidae. It is endemic to Mexico. It inhabits a small coastal lowland area of Guerrero state close to the Tecpan River.

References

Bipes (lizard)
Endemic reptiles of Mexico
Fauna of the Southern Pacific dry forests
Taxa named by Alfredo Dugès
Reptiles described in 1894